Acarospora strigata is an areolate to verruculous crustose lichen that grows on rock around the world, in full sun or shade, and in mesic to arid habitats. It is brown but may appear white or pale gray if it is covered in a pruina. The lichen is common in southwestern deserts of North America.

Areolas (from tiny to 3mm) surrounding dark reddish-brown to black apothecia are both highly variable in shape and size, and variable in size relative to each other. Measuring 0.1–1 mm, the apothecia range in size from small dots on the areolas to almost as wide as the areola. They can be pointlike to round, polygonal to stellate radiating fissures, and one to many per areola. The lichen as a whole can thus appear as a collection of contiguous light rimmed dark circular forms, to a collection of whitish warts with dark dots.

Areoles may be cracked on the surface, especially toward the apothecia.

Lichen spot tests are all negative.

References

strigata
Lichen species
Lichens described in 1855
Fungi of North America
Taxa named by William Nylander (botanist)